Piece is Korean recording artist Lena Park's debut album. It was released on February 1, 1998. The album sold 300,000–500,000 copies despite being released during the East Asian financial crisis.

Track listing 
 Intro - 0:52
 나의 하루 (Naui Haru; My Day) - 4:09
 P.S. I Love You - 3:56
 2Gether - 3:58
 반전 (Banjeon; Antiwar) - 4:32
 The Player (feat. Players) - 4:07
 오랜만에 (Acoustic Version) (Oraenmane; In a Long Time) - 4:41
 요즘 넌... (Yojeum Neon...; You Nowadays...) - 4:06
 사랑보다 깊은 상처 (feat. 임재범 - Lim Jae Bum) (Sarangboda Gipeun Sangcheo; A Wound Deeper Than Love) - 4:24
 Interlude - 0:20
 Glorious Day for It - 4:33
 오랜만에 (R&B Version) (Oraenmane; In a Long Time) - 4:29

External links 
Lena Park Official Korean Website 

1998 debut albums